Barbarian is a 2022 American horror thriller film written and directed by Zach Cregger in his solo screen writing and directorial debut. It is produced by Arnon Milchan, Roy Lee, Raphael Margules, and J.D. Lifshitz. The film stars Georgina Campbell, Bill Skarsgård, and Justin Long. The plot sees a woman find out that the rental home she reserved has been accidentally double-booked by a man, not knowing of a dark secret within the dwelling.

Barbarian premiered at San Diego Comic-Con on July 22, 2022, and was theatrically released in the United States on September 9, 2022, by 20th Century Studios. The film received largely positive reviews, with praise for Cregger's screenplay and direction as well as the cast performances. The film grossed $45 million worldwide on a production budget of $4–4.5 million.

Plot 
Tess Marshall arrives at a rental house in the rundown Detroit neighborhood of Brightmoor on the evening before a job interview. However, she finds it has been double-booked and is already occupied by a man named Keith Toshko. Initially unnerved by Keith, Tess warms up to him and decides to stay the night while Keith sleeps on the sofa. When she wakes up in the middle of the night, she is shaken to find her bedroom door has been opened, but Keith is asleep and assures her he did not touch the door.

The next morning, Tess goes for her interview and is warned not to stay in the area near the house. Returning to the house she is chased inside by a homeless man who yells at her to leave. She becomes locked in the basement and stumbles across a hidden corridor, leading to a room with a camcorder, a stained mattress, and a bloody handprint. 

Keith returns to the house, frees Tess from the basement, and investigates the hidden corridor. When he does not return, Tess follows him and finds a subterranean tunnel attached to the hidden corridor, where she finds Keith injured. The pair are attacked by a naked, deformed woman (credited as 'The Mother') who kills Keith.

Two weeks later, the house’s owner, actor AJ Gilbride, is fired from a television series over allegations that he raped his co-star. Pressured to sell assets to pay his legal costs, AJ travels to Detroit to inspect the house before selling it. AJ finds the hidden tunnel and tries to measure it, believing it may increase the house's value. The Mother attacks AJ in the tunnel and he falls into a hole where he meets Tess.

A flashback to the 1980s shows Frank, the house’s original owner, abducting women, raping them, and keeping them captive in the tunnels. 

In the present, the Mother locks Tess and AJ in a hole. Tess tells AJ that the Mother wants them to act as her children. AJ is dragged away by the Mother, who forcibly breastfeeds him. Tess uses the opportunity to escape the house with the help of Andre, the homeless man from earlier, who warns her that the Mother will come after her at nightfall. 

With the Mother distracted by Tess’s escape, AJ finds a room which the Mother refuses to approach. Inside, he finds a bedridden Frank, assuming him to be another victim of the Mother. AJ assures Frank that he will call the police, before finding evidence of Frank’s crimes. Frank kills himself with a concealed revolver. 

Tess leads police to the house, but they dismiss her story and leave as night falls. Tess breaks into the house, retrieves her car keys, and rams the Mother with her car, seemingly killing her. Tess returns to the basement to rescue AJ, who accidentally shoots her with Frank’s gun. The two escape and find that the Mother has vanished. Tess and AJ then take shelter with Andre.

Andre explains that the Mother is a product of Frank’s multigenerational incest with his victims. The Mother bursts in, kills Andre, and chases Tess and AJ up a water tower. AJ loses his gun and pushes Tess off the water tower to save himself. The Mother jumps after her and shields her from the fall. AJ finds Tess is still alive, but as he tries to rationalize his actions to Tess, the Mother revives and kills him. The Mother attempts to comfort Tess, but she shoots the Mother dead with Frank’s gun and limps away as the sun rises.

Cast

Production 

Zach Cregger was inspired by the non-fiction book The Gift of Fear, citing a section that encourages women to trust their intuition and not ignore the subconscious red flags that arise in their day-to-day interactions with men. He sat down to write a single thirty-page scene that would incorporate as many of these red flags as possible. Cregger settled on a woman showing up to an Airbnb late at night, only to find that it had been double booked, as the ideal set-up for this exercise. He stuck to the rule that if he was surprising himself with his writing, then he has to be surprising his audience. “As long as I have no long plan, then no one could know what’s coming.”

He became frustrated during the writing process, fearing the direction of the story was too predictable. So Cregger, with no forethought, decided to introduce a twist that would "flip [the scene] on its head."

While writing the screenplay, Cregger named the film Barbarian as a placeholder. As the story progressed, the name eventually became the title of the film.

Early in pre-production, Cregger reportedly reached out to multiple financiers and distributors, including A24 and Neon, but was rejected. J.D. Lifshitz and Raphael Margules agreed to produce the film through their BoulderLight Pictures banner, and were later joined by Vertigo Entertainment, after Lifshitz and Margules reached out to Vertigo's Roy Lee who had served as an early mentor to the duo. In mid-2020, Lifshitz and Margules accrued a $3.5 million budget for the film, largely through foreign financing, most of it from the French production company Logical Pictures.

Zac Efron was the first choice to play AJ, whom Cregger had envisioned as a "beefcake kind of himbo." However, when Efron turned down the role, Cregger decided to take the character's image in a different direction and cast Justin Long for his "warm and disarming and charming, lovable presence onscreen" which he thought would make AJ more engaging to audiences.

That same year, Lee brought in Bill Skarsgård, who had previously worked with Lee in It (2017) and It Chapter Two (2019), to co-star and serve as an executive producer. Barbarian began principal photography in early 2021 in Bulgaria. The film was shot in Sofia, while exterior neighborhood shots beyond the house's block were filmed in the Brightmoor neighborhood of Detroit. In April 2021, Logical's founder and the film's main financier Eric Tavitian, died of cancer. Unsure of the film's future, Lee secured financial backing from New Regency who increased the budget to $4.5 million, and as a result, 20th Century Studios became the film's distributor, stemming from a prior distribution deal between Regency and The Walt Disney Studios, 20th Century's parent division.

Themes and interpretations
Barbarian has been characterized as having themes related to sexual abuse and trauma. Writing for Film School Rejects, Aurora Amidon asserted that the film is essentially about "the ripple effects of abuse", concerning the characters of AJ and Frank—who, in the habit of harming women for their own pleasure,  are cut from the same cloth. In a piece for Forbes, Dani Di Placido drew similarities between the film's main antagonist The Mother (who is a product of violent, incessant sexual abuse) and Frankenstein, both "being a misshapen creature brought into the world through an unnatural process, unloved, isolated, and ultimately, sympathetic".

Release
Barbarian was originally scheduled to be theatrically released in the United States by 20th Century Studios on August 12, 2022, before being rescheduled to be released on August 31, and later September 9. Disney reportedly maintained a theatrical release for Barbarian (as opposed to a streaming release on Hulu) due to strong, positive reception from studio test screenings.

CinemaBlend and AMC Theatres premiered the film at the 2022 San Diego Comic-Con on July 22, where it garnered positive reactions. The film was also screened at the Arrow Video FrightFest on August 29. The film was released on October 20, 2022 in Australia, on October 27 in New Zealand, and on October 28 in the United Kingdom.

In the United States, Barbarian was released on digital download and to stream on HBO Max beginning on October 25. It was also released on Star+ in Latin America and on Disney+ as part of the Star content hub in other international territories on October 26, 2022

The film was released on Disney+ as part of the Star content hub in the United Kingdom on December 14, 2022. A soundtrack album for the film featuring score by Anna Drubich was released by Hollywood Records on December 9, 2022.

Marketing
The first trailer for Barbarian was released on June 23, 2022, and appeared at the front of theatrical showings of The Black Phone. According to Margules, Disney marketed the film to "feel like a discovery" and teasing very little of the film's plot in promotional materials.

After the film's release, an alternative trailer was released on September 23, playfully portraying the film as "Justin Long's New Movie" before transitioning into the more horrific scenes.

Reception

Streaming viewership 
According to the streaming aggregator Reelgood, Barbarian was the fifth most watched program across all platforms, during the week of October 26, 2022. According to Whip Media, Barbarian was the most streamed film across all platforms in the United States, during the week ending October 30, 2022, and the sixth during the week ending November 13, 2022. According to the streaming aggregator JustWatch, Barbarian was the second most streamed film across all platforms in the United States, during the week of October 31, 2022, to November 6, 2022.

Box office 
Barbarian grossed $40.9 million in the United States and Canada, and $4.5 million in other territories, for a worldwide total of $45.4 million, against a production budget of $4.5 million.

In the United States and Canada, Barbarian was released alongside Brahmāstra: Part One – Shiva and Lifemark, and made $3.9 million from 2,340 theaters on its first day, including $850,000 from Thursday night previews. It went on to debut to $10 million, topping the box office; 59% of the audience was male, with 74% being between 18 and 34. The film made $6.3 million in its second weekend, finishing behind newcomer The Woman King. Deadline Hollywood called the 40% week-to-week drop "pretty spectacular", noting that horror films typically see a 65% decline in their sophomore frames. The film was added to 550 theaters in its third weekend and made $4.8 million, finishing fourth at the box office.

Critical response 
  Audiences polled by CinemaScore gave the film an average grade of "C+" on an A+ to F scale, while those at PostTrak gave the film a 70% overall positive score, with 54% saying they would definitely recommend it.

Accolades 
The film is one of the media that received the ReFrame Stamp for the years 2022 to 2023. The stamp is awarded by the gender equity coalition ReFrame and industry database IMDbPro for film and television projects that are proven to have gender-balanced hiring, with stamps being awarded to projects that hire female-identifying people, especially women of color, in four out of eight key roles for their production.

References

External links
 
 

2022 films
2022 comedy horror films
2022 horror thriller films
2020s American films
2020s English-language films
2020s monster movies
20th Century Studios films
American comedy horror films
American horror thriller films
Films about kidnapping in the United States
Films about rape in the United States
Films produced by Roy Lee
American monster movies
Films set in California
Films set in Detroit
Films set in subterranea
Films shot in Bulgaria
Incest in film
Regency Enterprises films
Vertigo Entertainment films